Svein Olav Agnalt (born 20 July 1949) is a Norwegian politician for the Labour Party.

He served as a deputy representative to the Norwegian Parliament from Østfold during the term 1977–1981.

On the local level Agnalt is the mayor of Skiptvet municipality since 2007.

References

1949 births
Living people
Deputy members of the Storting
Labour Party (Norway) politicians
Mayors of places in Østfold
Place of birth missing (living people)
20th-century Norwegian politicians